Shiri Eisner is a genderqueer bisexual writer and activist based in Tel Aviv. Eisner works towards deconstructing stereotypes attached to bisexuality arguing that their subversive power should be utilized rather than rejected by bisexual movements. In their book, Bi: Notes for a Bisexual Revolution, Eisner writes about monosexual privilege, the harms it can cause in society, and the intersection of transgender people and bisexuality. The book was nominated in 2014 for a "Lammy" from the Lambda Literary Awards.

Bibliography    

Eisner, Shiri (2016). "Monosexism". The SAGE Encyclopedia of LGBTQ Studies. Edited by Abbie E. Goldberg, SAGE.
Eisner, Shiri (2020). "Queer Vegan Politics and Consistent Anti-Oppression". Queer and Trans Voices: Achieving Liberation Through Consistent Anti-Oppression. Edited by Julia Feliz Brueck and Zoie Zane McNeill, Sanctuary Publishers.

References

External links 
 Papadopoulos Lecture, Shiri Eisner (2015 video)
 Bi radical: Intersectional. Radical. Bisexual culture (Shiri Eisner's English language blog)

21st-century Israeli writers
21st-century Israeli women writers
Bisexual women
Bisexual writers
Living people
Bisexual Jews
Israeli LGBT rights activists
Mizrahi Jewish culture
Writers from Tel Aviv
Place of birth missing (living people)
Israeli LGBT writers
Israeli bisexual people
Israeli non-binary people
Non-binary writers
Non-binary activists
Bisexual non-binary people
1983 births